The United States Army Medical Materiel Agency (USAMMA), a subordinate unit of the U.S. Army Medical Research and Materiel Command (USAMRMC) at Fort Detrick, Maryland, serves as the U.S. Army's executive agent for strategic medical acquisition and logistics programs.

The US Army Medical Materiel Agency (USAMMA) serves as the U.S. Army's life cycle management command (LCMC) for strategic medical acquisition, project management and logistics programs.  The USAMMA manages strategic programs across the globe; equips and sustains the medical force within the Active Army, Army Reserve, and Army National Guard components; and develops medical technologies/devices/materiel innovations for use across the battlefield and at fixed Medical Treatment Facilities (MTFs).  The Agency also centrally manages the Army Prepositioned Stocks and The Office of the Surgeon General's contingency programs as well as other readiness support programs designed for all Army components during full spectrum operations. The Agency deploys Medical Logistics Support Teams (MLST) and/or Forward Repair Activity-Medical (FRA-M) as required to support Joint operations in the different theaters.  The Agency also provides Army Medical Department National Maintenance Program expertise and Sustainment Maintenance technical proficiency to ensure medical maintenance supportability and training requirements, equipment reliability and maintainability, and the maintenance repair and services of medical equipment and technologies.

History
USAMMA's origin is traced to the early part of World War II when the Army Surgeon General recognized the need to develop Army medical materiel support to the rapidly expanding mobilization forces.  The genesis of USAMMA began in 1943 when the Procurement Division of the Supply Service, Office of the Surgeon General (OTSG), was renamed the Purchase Division and transferred to the Army Medical Purchasing Office in Manhattan, New York. Later that year, the Inventory Control Branch, Distribution and Requirements Division, OTSG, was also transferred to the Army Medical Purchasing Office. The Medical Testing Laboratory transferred from Binghamton, New York, in February 1943. Later that year, the Contract Termination Branch was added. In 1944, the Renegotiation and Stock Control Divisions were moved from the OTSG to New York.

On 21 May 1953, the Army Medical Supply Control Office was organized at Brooklyn, New York, and assigned to the Surgeon General. On 30 April 1965, the unit was re-designated the Army Medical Supply Control Office and on 1 January 1957, the office was again re-designated as the Army Medical Supply Support Activity, a Class II off-post activity of the Surgeon General.

On 2 April 1965, the activity transferred from Brooklyn to Valley Forge General Hospital, Phoenixville, Pennsylvania, and was renamed the United States Army Medical Materiel Agency (USAMMA), effective 15 April 1965.

In 1974, USAMMA moved to Fort Detrick, Maryland and in 1994 was placed under the newly formed United States Army Medical Research and Materiel Command.  In addition to the USAMMA headquarters located at Fort Detrick, USAMMA has operational maintenance and storage locations in Camp Carroll, South Korea; Sagami General Depot, Japan; Defense Depot Tracy, California; Sierra Army Depot, California; Defense Depot Hill, Utah; Tobyhanna Army Depot, Pennsylvania; Naval Weapons Station Charleston, South Carolina; Husterhoeh Kaserne, Pirmasens, Germany; As Saliyah Army Base, Qatar; and Camp Arifjan, Kuwait.

Commanders of USAMMA and its precursors

References 
This article contains information that originally came from US Government publications and websites and is in the public domain.

External links 
 USAMRMC website
 USAMMA website
 USAMRMC: 50 Years of Dedication to the Warfighter (1958-2008)

Fort Detrick
Army, Medical Materiel Agency